This is an all-time list of Women's National Basketball Association head coaches.

Coaches

Note: Coaching records are correct as of the end of the 2020 season.

External links
 WNBA.com Coaches Page

Head
Coaches
Women's sport-related lists